The Farmers Market is a wet market located at the Araneta City in Cubao, Quezon City. The market opened in 1975 and serves as one of the best and largest fresh produce markets both in Metro Manila and in the country. The market is owned by the ACI, Inc., and is monitored by the Quezon City Government.

History

The construction of the market began in 1974, before being completed in 1975. The market is formerly located in the Farmers Plaza basement area from 1969-1975, before moving in to its present location located across the mall. The market was also featured by numerous chefs, food critics, TV personalities, and local government officials, such as American chef, author and TV personality Anthony Bourdain, Rick Bayless, and Margarita Forés.

Location
The market is located within Epifanio de los Santos Avenue (EDSA), and across the Farmers Plaza and the Metro Rail Transit System (Line 3) station in the north. The market is also located near commercial buildings, malls, shopping areas, entertainment venues, hotels, office towers, residential condominiums and transport hubs such as the Vivaldi Residences Cubao in the north; the Gateway Mall, the Gateway Tower, the New Frontier Theater, the Aurora Tower, the Light Rail Transit System (Line 2) station and the Manhattan Parkway and Parkview towers of the Manhattan Gardens complex in the northeast; the Smart Araneta Coliseum, Novotel Manila Araneta City, Shopwise Hypermarket and the Manhattan Plaza in the east; the Araneta City Cyberpark, SM Cubao, Ali Mall and the Manhattan Heights in the southeast; and the Farmers Garden in the south.

Features

The market features a variety of local shops that primarily sells fresh products, ranging from fishes, meat, and fruits and vegetables, and also features the Fishmoko section a fish market highlighting live fish stored in freshwater tanks, and the Dampa sa Farmers Market (Dampa at the Farmers Market), a food court offering fresh foods and freshly cooked meals from the market stalls. The market is also occupied by various merchandise shops, a barbershop, a hair salon, bakeries; and fast-food chains, such as Jollibee, McDonald's,  Chowking, Tokyo Tokyo, Tapa King, and King Sisig; and Mercury Drug.

Due to the effects of the COVID-19 pandemic in the country, the market also accepts online transactions and payments in order to promote cashless payments, while enforcing strict safety protocols and standards.

Awards
The market was awarded numerous times by various organizations, including the Quezon City Government, where the market is included in the city's Cleanest Market Hall of Fame.

References

1975 establishments in the Philippines
Buildings and structures in Quezon City
Retail markets in Metro Manila